Rheinmetall Air Defence AG is a division of German armament manufacturer Rheinmetall, created when the company's Oerlikon Contraves unit was renamed on 1 January 2009 and integrated with Rheinmetall's other air-defence products. Oerlikon Contraves was a Swiss anti-aircraft artillery manufacturer famous for its adaptation of the 1916 20 mm Becker as the Oerlikon 20 mm autocannon design, which was used in the Second World War and still in use today. Copies and derivatives of these designs were made by German, French, British and Japanese weapon manufacturers. Oerlikon Contraves was purchased by Rheinmetall in 1999.
  
, Rheinmetall Air Defence had around 1,050 employees at locations in Switzerland, Germany, Italy and Canada.

History
Oerlikon's earliest predecessor was Schweizerische Werkzeugmaschinenfabrik Oerlikon, founded in the Oerlikon district of Zurich, Switzerland in 1906.

In 1923 it acquired a factory in Germany. It entered the anti-aircraft defence field in 1924. In 1936, it founded a purely anti-aircraft development company called Contraves (contra aves is Latin for "against birds", better translated as "anti-flying-objects") In 1989, the Werkzeugmaschinenfabrik Oerlikon-Bührle and Contraves merged to form the Oerlikon-Contraves Group, later renamed Oerlikon Contraves Defence. Oerlikon Contraves was purchased by Rheinmetall, a German armament manufacturer, in 1999, and renamed Rheinmetall Air Defence AG on 1 January 2009.

Historic products

American versions of the Oerlikon 20 mm cannon, such as the Mk 4, Mk 10, and Mk 24, were used extensively from World War II to the Vietnam War. As anti-aircraft weapons used by the US Navy, they were frequently the last line of defence against kamikaze attacks. Most combat ships from aircraft carriers to PT boats were equipped with Oerlikon guns. During the Vietnam War they were widely employed by riverine forces as anti-personnel weapons. They remained in service until the 1970s, when they were replaced by the Mk 16 20 mm cannon.

Oerlikon also developed the following surface-to-air missiles: the RSA Missile, the RSD 58, and the Kriens RSC Missile.
Oerlikons 20mm cannon was frequently used on Naval Ships throughout the 1920s, 30s and 40s.

Products 
Rheinmetall Air Defence specializes in ground-based and naval air defence. Their products include search-and-tracking sensors, 35 mm air-defence guns, command-and-control posts, battle management and ship-based combat systems.

Naval systems
Search and Acquisition Radar: Oerlikon X-TAR3D/M
Radar and Electro Optical Tracking Modules: Oerlikon TMX/EO NT and Oerlikon TMX/EO Mk2
Naval Gun Systems: Rheinmetall Oerlikon Millennium Gun
Command and Control: Oerlikon Seaguard Command and Control Console and Oerlikon Weapon Control Module

Ground-based air defence 

Ground Based Air Defence Unit: Oerlikon Skyshield
 Mobile Air Defence: Oerlikon Skyranger 30 and Skyranger 35
Oerlikon GDF 35 mm caliber twin cannon
Oerlikon KBA 25 mm automatic cannon
Air Defence Anti-Tank System
LLM01 laser light module for firearms
Mosquito (missile)

Civilian products 
Oerlikon Contraves subsidiary Oerlikon Transtec manufactured railcar and locomotive systems, including locomotive brakes, subway and electric train power conversion systems, and other subsidiary systems for mass-transit vehicles. , Rheinmetall's website no longer lists these products as part of the Air Defence group.

Corruption charges
Rheinmetall Air Defence (RAD) is one of six companies that were blacklisted by India's Ministry of Defence in March 2012 for their involvement in a bribery scandal. The companies are accused of bribing the Director General of Ordnance Factories Board (OFB), Sudipta Ghosh. RAD and the other firms have been barred from any dealings with the OFB and all other Indian defence companies, as well as being blacklisted from participating in any Indian defence contract, for a period of 10 years. RAD has claimed that the charges against it are without merit.

Rheinmetall Air Defence was implicated in a corruption case in India along with arms dealer Abhishek Verma and his wife Anca Verma lodged by anti-corruption agency of India, the CBI in 2012 for bribing defence officials for securing multi billion dollar weapons contracts of the Indian military establishment. RAD Chairman Bodo Garbe and General Manager Gerhard Hoy were issued summons of the Indian courts. Subsequently a red-corner notice was issued for their detention through Interpol. The case at present is under trial in Indian courts.

See also 

30mm DS30M Mark 2 Automated Small Calibre Gun

References

 Air Force Center "Fliegermuseum Dübendorf"
 Hugo Schneider: Armament and equipment of the Swiss Army since 1817: light and medium anti-aircraft air defence anti-aircraft missiles, Volume 12 of armament and equipment of the Swiss Army since 1817, Author Publisher Stocker-Schmidt, 1982

External links

 Rheinmetall-DeTec, parent company
 Official site

Firearm manufacturers of Switzerland
Rheinmetall
 

fi:Oerlikon